The IF Malmö Redhawks (colloquially referred to simply as Malmö or by past abbreviation MIF) is a Swedish professional ice hockey team based in Malmö which plays in the SHL, with Malmö Arena as the venue for home games. 

The history of the team dates back to 1947 as the ice hockey division of the now exclusively football club Malmö FF. In 1972 the team divested from Malmö FF, marking the start of the hockey association initially known as Malmö IF. The team name was changed to MIF Redhawks in 2001 and then to the present name IF Malmö Redhawks in 2004. Officially the team goes by the name Ishockeyföreningen Malmö Redhawks (Ice Hockey Association Malmö Redhawks). The current CEO is Patrik Sylvegård who represented the team during his senior playing career.

History 

The team was inaugurated on 28 February 1972 as Malmö Ishockeyförening (Malmö Ice Hockey Association, or MIF) when the ice hockey division of Malmö FF was transitioned into an independent association. The early history of the team was not very remarkable, spent in the lower divisions of Swedish hockey. Relegation to Division 2 in 1984 became the spark to a series of events including the departure of Nils Yngvesson who had been chairman of the association since its creation in 1972. The team only played one season in Division 2 before being promoted back to Division 1, where Malmö IF made what it referred to as "the biggest investment in Swedish sports history."

The team's campaign to reach the top league failed that season, but in the 1989–90 season, the team finished first in both their autumn Division 1 group, as well as the Allsvenskan in the spring, and then won the Allsvenskan final 3–0 in games against MoDo to secure promotion to Elitserien (today called the SHL) for the first time. They would remain in the top flight for 15 seasons, a period that would bring two name changes (to MIF Redhawks in 1996 and to IF Malmö Redhawks in 2003), as well as two Swedish Championship titles, in 1992 and 1994, and the 1993 European championship.

Mid 2000's downturn 
At the end of the 2004–05 season, the Redhawks participated in the qualification series to stay in Elitserien, where they did not manage to secure one of the spots for staying up, and were relegated. Thus, as of the 2005–06 season, they played in the HockeyAllsvenskan, the second division hockey league in Sweden; at the end of the season, the top four teams played the qualification series with the bottom two teams of Elitserien. Malmö won the qualification round and played in Elitserien during the 2006–07 season.

In 2007, the Malmö Redhawks participated in a qualification series (Kvalserien) consisting of the top four teams of HockeyAllsvenskan and the bottom two teams from Elitserien, having finished 12th in the 2006–07 Elitserien season. Malmö were considered favourites alongside the second team from Elitserien, Skellefteå AIK, but failed to re-qualify for Elitserien, falling two points behind Södertälje SK. In 2008 the team once again managed to reach Kvalserien, and had a golden opportunity to advance to Elitserien, leading the series for a majority of rounds. The Redhawks, however, lost in overtime of the final round while their arch rivals, Rögle BK, claimed the Elitserien spot with a margin of two points by scoring twice in the last minute of play. The Redhawks only managed to get 2 points in the 2008 Kvalserien's last four rounds, despite having gotten 15 points after the first six games.

New arena and financial issues 

During the 2008–09 season, the Redhawks moved to the, at the time, newly constructed and inaugurated Malmö Arena, a top-modern sports and entertainment venue, located in Hyllie in the southern parts of Malmö.

On 29 January 2009, while still playing in HockeyAllsvenskan, the team released all its contracted players due to financial debt and in order to avoid bankruptcy. The players were made free to find and sign with other teams. By then the Redhawks were ranked 10th in the league with only one month of games remaining to play, instead of the top three or seven required for Kvalserien and possible Elitserien qualification. The team finished 8th and thus missed the playoffs, although the team was just one point short from reaching the playoffs.

Failures to reach Kvalserien and started efforts
Malmö finished fifth in HockeyAllsvenskan in the 2009–10 season and thus reached the playoffs, which was an improvement over last season. The Redhawks started the playoffs by knocking out Bofors IK in two straight games, and the Redhawks were now set to face Almtuna IS for a series that would decide which team would be HockeyAllsvenskan's fourth one in Kvalserien. The Redhawks beat Almtuna 2–1 at home in the first game, but lost the two following games (which the Redhawks played on away ice) and thus were eliminated from the playoffs. In the 2010–11 season, things went worse as the Redhawks failed to reach the playoffs, finishing 8th and four points short from a playoff spot.

On 28 January 2011, during the 2010–11 season, the Redhawks announced that they had agreed to a 3-year 70-million SEK ($10.6 million USD) deal with businessman Hugo Stenbeck. The goal with the deal was to get Malmö Redhawks back to Elitserien.

Malmö's efforts to reach Elitserien started immediately prior to the 2011–12 season. Several players from higher divisions, including Hannu Toivonen, Daniel Josefsson, J. D. Forrest, Jean-Luc Grand-Pierre and Linus Klasen, joined the team. When Linus Klasen joined the team on 17 May 2011, he was immediately appointed the team's captain. Linus Klasen's three-year contract included an annual salary of 4 million SEK ($0.6 million USD), which made Klasen the best paid ice hockey player in Sweden at that time.

The season started well with a top-three spot in the league after a couple of months, but after falling down to sixth place with 47 points, at that time 10 points away from the third Kvalserien spot, Redhawks then-head coach Leif Strömberg was fired on 10 December 2011. He was replaced by the team's then-assistant coach Ulf Taavola. Patrik Sylvegård was acquired as the team's new assistant coach. After continuing to struggle throughout January, the Malmö Redhawks improved in February, and managed a seventh-place finish in the league, which was enough for a playoff spot. In the Playoff round, Malmö finished second due to inferior goal difference than Rögle BK, and therefor did not qualify the 2012 Kvalserien.

Reconstruction 
In early 2012, Malmö Redhawks stated that the financial situation needed to be reviewed, after Hugo Stenbeck had withdrawn from the organisation. They filed for economic reconstruction on 11 April 2012. The filing was granted the following day. The team re-negotiated the most expensive player contracts in order to reduce the total salary cap from 30 million SEK down to 18 million.

On 17 May 2012 it was announced that Malmö Redhawks and Hugo Stenbeck had agreed that Stenbeck would help buy out Linus Klasen and Hannu Toivonen due to their expensive contracts.

After the 2011–12 season, Patrik Sylvegård was appointed CEO and sports director, and Redhawks profile Mats Lusth was acquired as the new assistant coach. A Sports Committee was also created, which includes people with strong connection to Malmö Redhawks. Ulf Taavola continued as head coach like the previous season when he took over Leif Strömberg. Malmö Redhawks had to sign a lot of new players. The players who remained from last season were Pontus Sjögren, Emil Carnestad, Stefan Lassen, Alexander Ribbenstrand, Robin Alvarez, Lukas Eriksson, Magnus Häggström, Tomas Kollar and Roger Olsson.

The Malmö Redhawks started the 2012–13 season bad, and after 17 games played, the team had only taken 21 points, which was far from even a playoff spot towards Kvalserien. Eventually, the team began a massive boost, which went through the month of November without a single loss after regulation time, and took a total of 24 out of 27 points that month. As a result of the great effort in November, the Redhawks were located in fifth place in the league by early December. In January, the team began a losing streak and lost eight games in a row. The team finished in ninth place, which was the worst placing the team had since the large investments during the late 1980s. In Malmö, the season was over on March 2, when the regular season was finished.

SHL comeback 
This was Malmö's eighth consecutive season in HockeyAllsvenskan, which is the second-highest league in Sweden. In the regular-season from 11 September 2014 to 26 February 2015 Malmö finished in third place which meant they qualified for 2015 Slutsspelsserien against Leksands IF. Coming into game seven it was tied 3-3 and the game was played on Leksand's arena Tegera Arena, after a hard-fought game Malmö Redhawks won 4-2 with one goal being with empty net. Winning against Leksands IF meant that Malmö now played in SHL.

Since the comeback to the top flight, the team has managed to reach the semi-final in 2017 and 2018, and an additional quarter final in 2019.

Season-by-season record
This is a partial list of the last five seasons completed by the Redhawks. For the full season-by-season history, see List of Malmö Redhawks seasons

Note: GP = Games played, W = Wins, L = Losses, OTL = Ovetime Losses, Pts = Points, GF = Goals for, GA = Goals against

Players and personnel

Current roster

Last updated on 24 February 2023

Honored members

Notable alumni

 Philip Falcone
 Peter Andersson
 Róbert Švehla 
 Richard Park 
 Raimo Helminen 
 Mats Näslund
 Mats Hallin
 Fedor Fedorov 
 Peter Hammarström
 Andreas Lilja
 Kim Johnsson
 Juha Riihijärvi 
 Daniel Rydmark
 Jani Hurme 
 Tomas Sandström
 Gustav Nyquist
 Carl Söderberg
 Martin Fehérváry
 Rasmus Andersson
 André Burakovsky

See also
Ice hockey in Sweden

Notes

References

External links

  
 Redhawks Support  – official supporter club site

 
Ice hockey teams in Sweden
Swedish Hockey League teams
Sports organizations established in 1972
Sports organizations in Malmö
1972 establishments in Sweden
Malmö Arena
Ice hockey teams in Skåne County
Ice hockey teams in Malmö
20th-century establishments in Skåne County